The Catholic University of Santiago del Estero (UCSE) is an institution created by a group of lay Catholics in collaboration with the Congregation of the Brothers of Mercy, and was inaugurated on June 21, 1960, as the Instituto Universitario San José de Ciencias Políticas, Sociales y Económicas.

Its main, Santiago del Estero campus was built in 1979, and the institution maintains campuses in San Salvador de Jujuy (1993), Olivos (1994), and Rafaela (1997). The main campus is known for its arboretum, the Estación Experimental Fernández, which features over 15,000 trees (jacarandas, silk floss, tipas, pau d'arco, prosopis, and casuarinas, among others). 
  

1960 establishments in Argentina
Educational institutions established in 1960
Private universities in Argentina
Universities in Santiago del Estero Province